This is a list of parks in Chicago. There are 614 parks in the city, covering 8.2 % of its total land acreage.

Notable parks

Other parks

 Abbott Park 49 E 95th St, Chicago, IL 60619
 Ada Park 11250 S Ada St, Chicago, IL 60643
 Adams Park
 Jane Addams Park
 Almond Park
 Altgeld Park
 Amundsen Park
 Anderson Park
 Arcade Park
 Archer Park
 Armour Square Park
 Armstrong Park
 Arrigo Park
 Ashe Beach Park
 Auburn Park
 Augusta Park
 Austin Park
 Avalon Park
 Avondale Park
 Bauler Park
 Bessemer Park
 Bell Park
 Berger Park
 Bixler Park
 Blackhawk Park
 Boler Park
 Arnita Young Boswell Park
 Boyce Park
 Bosley Park
 Bradley Park
 Brown Memorial Park
 Gwendolyn Brooks Park
 Calumet Park — 
 Carver Park
 Chopin Park
 Cole Park
 Bessie Coleman Park
 Cooper Park
 Oscar O. D'Angelo Park — also known as Wacker Gateway Park 
 Debow Park
 Dickinson Park
 Lorraine L. Dixon Park
 Donovan Park
 Dunbar Park
 Dunham Park
 Durkin Park
 DuSable Park
 Dvorak Park
 Eckhart Park
 Ellis Park
 Eugene Field Park
 Fernwood Park
 Foster Park
 Fuller Park
 Gage Park
 Gompers Park
 Goudy Square Park
 Gross Park
 Hamilton Park
 Lorraine Hansberry Park
 Ryan Harris Memorial Park
 Harrison Park
 Hiawatha Park
 Vivian Gordon Hash Park
 Hayes Park
 Holstein Park
 Houston Park
 Horner Park
 Hoyne Park
 Independence Park
 Indian Boundary Park
 Mahalia Jackson Park
 Jefferson Park
 Nancy Jefferson Park
 Mary Jane Richardson Jones Park, named after activist Mary Jane Richardson Jones
 Kelvyn Park
 Kenwood Community Park — formerly Shoesmith Field
 King Park and Family Entertainment Center
 Kosciuszko Park
 La Follette Park (Chicago)
 La Villita Park
 Legion Park  
 Leland Giants Park
 Loyola Park
 Maggie Daley Park
 Mandrake Park
 Mann Park
 Mariano Park
 Mason Park
 McGuane Park
 McKinley Park 
 Merrimac Park
 Metcalfe Park
 Midway Plaisance  
 Mount Greenwood Park
 Mozart Park
 Donald Jordan Nash Community Center
 Nichols Park
 Normandy Park
 Northerly Island Park
 Oakdale Park
 Ogden Park
 Olson Park and Waterfall — demolished 
 Jesse Owens Park
 Oz Park
 Park No. 559
 Palmer Park
 Lucy Ella Gonzales Parsons Park
 Peoples Park
 Ping Tom Memorial Park  
 Piotrowski Park
 Portage Park  
 Promontory Point
 Pulaski Park
 Revere Park
 Riis Park
 River Park  
 Robichaux Park
 Robinson Park
 Rogers Park 
 Rowan Park
 Russell Square Park
 Saint Louis Park
 Scottsdale Park
 Shabbona Park
 Shedd Park
 Sherman Park
 Skinner Park
 Smith Park
 South Shore Nature Reserve
 Spruce Park
 Stanton-Schiller Park
 Stars and Stripes Park
 Strohacker Park
 Robert Taylor Park
 Mamie Till-Mobley Park
 Union Park
 Vittum Park
 Warren Park —  
 Washington Park
 Washington Square Park
 Dinah Washington Park
 Harold Washington Park
 Welles Park
 Wicker Park
 Wiggly Field Noethling Park
 Wildwood Park
 Williams Park
 Wilson Park
 Winnemac Park
 West Pullman Park

References

Parks
Chicago